Qaleh-ye Kartilabad (also Romanized as Qal‘eh-ye Kartīlābād; also known as Ghal”eh Kartil Abad) is a village in Haram Rud-e Sofla Rural District, Samen District, Malayer County, Hamadan Province, Iran. At the 2006 census, its population was 129, in 39 families.

References 

Populated places in Malayer County